The 1990 St Albans City and District Council election took place on 3 May 1990 to elect members of St Albans City and District Council in England. This was on the same day as other local elections.

Summary

Ward results

Ashley

Batchwood

Clarence

Colney Heath

Cunningham

Harpenden East

Harpenden North

Harpenden South

Harpenden West

London Colney

Marshallwick North

Marshallwick South

Park Street

Redbourn

 
 

 

No Liberal Democrat candidate as previous (28.5%).

Sopwell

St. Peters

St. Stephens

Verulam

Wheathampstead

References

St Albans
St Albans City and District Council elections
1990s in Hertfordshire